"Heaven Can't Be Found" is a song written and recorded by American musician Hank Williams Jr. It was released in October 1987 as the second single from the album Born to Boogie.  The song reached number 4 on the Billboard Hot Country Singles & Tracks chart.

Chart performance

References

1988 singles
1987 songs
Hank Williams Jr. songs
Songs written by Hank Williams Jr.
Song recordings produced by Barry Beckett
Warner Records singles
Curb Records singles